Alex Brown may refer to:

Sports

 Alex Brown (cornerback) (born 1996), American football player
 Alex Brown (defensive end) (born 1979), American football player
 Alex Brown (footballer, born 1914) (1914–2006), English football forward for Chesterfield, Darlington, and Mansfield
 Alex Brown (footballer, born 1992), English footballer
 Alex Brown (Liberian footballer) (born 1978)
 Alex Brown (rugby league) (born 1987), Jamaican rugby league player
 Alex Brown (rugby union, born 1905) (1905–1986), Scotland international rugby union player
 Alex Brown (rugby union, born 1979), former English rugby union player
 Alex Brown (rugby union, born 1989), English rugby union player for Exeter Chiefs

Other people
 Alex Brown (musician) (1966–2019), American guitarist
 Alex Brown, businessperson and landowner in the history of Walnut Grove, California

Other uses
 Alex. Brown & Sons, the first investment bank in the United States

See also
 Alex Browne (disambiguation)
 Alexander Brown (disambiguation)
 Sandy Brown (disambiguation)

Brown, Alex